Edward Pettybourne (born 13 February 1988) is a former professional rugby league footballer who last played as a  for the Keighley Cougars. He played at international level for Samoa and the United States.

Early years
Pettybourne was born in Christchurch, New Zealand.

A Mascot Jets junior, Pettybourne attended Marcellin College Randwick. He represented Australia at schoolboy level in 2005.

Playing career

South Sydney Rabbitohs
Pettybourne made his NRL début against the North Queensland Cowboys in round 19 of 2007. He scored his first try in first grade in round 1 of 2009 when South Sydney defeated arch-rivals the Sydney Roosters 52-12. He played every game for South Sydney in 2009 and scored seven tries to be the club's fifth highest try scorer of the season. He made 526 tackles in 2009 which was the third highest in the club.

Pettybourne was a mainstay of South Sydney for the next three years, playing in over 20 games in both 2011 and 2012. He played in all 3 semi-finals in 2012, with the club finishing one game shy of the grand final.

Wests Tigers
With Souths unwilling to match the offer from Wests Tigers, Pettybourne joined his new club from 2013. Pettybourne said, "Madge, and the coaching staff said they wanted to keep me, but it was my choice. I just bought a house so I wanted to make sure I was comfortable paying it off, but it was more for my family."

Pettybourne stayed at the Wests Tigers for one season, playing in 12 games and failing to score any points.

Wigan Warriors
Pettybourne joined Super League club Wigan for the 2014 Super League season. He made his début in the opening game of the season against Huddersfield. On the 19 December 2014, Wigan announced that Pettybourne had been released from his contract for personal reasons. He left the Club half way through a two-year contract, after 18 games.

Gold Coast Titans
On 15 January 2015, Pettybourne signed a one-year contract with the Gold Coast starting effective immediately. On 10 July 2015, he re-signed with the Titans on a two-year contract.

Red Star Belgrade
On 5 June 2021, it was announced that Pettybourne had left Brooklyn Kings and signed for Red Star Belgrade following the postponement of the North American Rugby League 2021 season.

Limoux Grizzlies
On 6 July 2021, it was reported that he had signed for Limoux Grizzlies in the Elite One Championship
On 6 November 2022, Pettybourne announced his retirement from rugby league.

Representative career

New Zealand
In 2009, Pettybourne chose to represent New Zealand instead of playing for Australia. He was called up for the New Zealand squad at the 2009 Four Nations as a late replacement for the injured Ben Matulino and Bronson Harrison, but did not make any appearances for the team.

Samoa
In April 2013, Pettybourne played for Samoa in the Pacific Rugby League International against fierce pacific rivals Tonga.

United States
Later in the year, he was selected to play for the USA for the 2013 Rugby League World Cup. He played in all four of the US' world cup matches.

Coaching career
On 9 March 2021 it was reported by Villeneuve Leopards that he would take over the role of interim head coach for their fixture with Limoux Grizzlies, until Olivier Janzac could take over on 15 March, following the dismissal of Fabien Devecchi.

References

External links

 
 
 
 

1988 births
Living people
Brooklyn Kings captains
Brooklyn Kings players
Burleigh Bears players
Gold Coast Titans players
Keighley Cougars players
Limoux Grizzlies players
New Zealand emigrants to Australia
New Zealand people of American Samoan descent
New Zealand sportspeople of Samoan descent
New Zealand rugby league players
North Sydney Bears NSW Cup players
Red Star Rugby League players
Rugby league locks
Rugby league players from Christchurch
Rugby league props
Rugby league second-rows
Samoa national rugby league team players
Samoan sportspeople
South Sydney Rabbitohs players
Toulouse Olympique players
United States national rugby league team players
Villeneuve Leopards coaches
Villeneuve Leopards players
Wests Tigers NSW Cup players
Wests Tigers players
Wigan Warriors players